Gavaher (also Romanized as Gavāher; also known as Gavāhīr) is a village in Yengejeh Rural District, Howmeh District, Azarshahr County, East Azerbaijan Province, Iran. At the 2006 census, its population was 158, in 31 families.

References 

Populated places in Azarshahr County